The men's 3 miles event at the 1930 British Empire Games was held on 21 August at the Civic Stadium in Hamilton, Canada.

Results

References

Athletics at the 1930 British Empire Games
1930